Hammel, Green and Abrahamson (HGA) is an architecture, engineering, and planning firm that originated in Minnesota.  It was founded in 1953 by Minnesotans Dick Hammel and Curt Green (Bruce Abrahamson joined in shortly thereafter).

All three of HGA's founders were schooled in the Bauhaus tradition, which stressed a collaborative and inter-disciplinary approach to Modernism. They began their work designing K-12 school buildings.  The firm later expanded into other areas, such as healthcare, corporate environments and higher education.  They are currently one of the largest firms in Minnesota.

HGA has expanded into eleven national offices: Minneapolis and Rochester, MN; Los Angeles, Sacramento, San Diego, San Jose and San Francisco, CA; Milwaukee and Madison, WI; Boston, MA; Alexandria, VA and Washington, D.C.

In October 2018, HGA announced its acquisition of Wilson Architects, a Boston-based firm specializing in science and technology facilities for higher education and corporate clients.

Leadership
 Tim Carl, FAIA, Chief Executive Officer
 Scott Lindvall, AIA, Chief Operating Officer
 Angie Edwards, CPA, Chief Financial Officer
Jennifer Klund, AIA, ACHA, Chairperson of the Board

Notable buildings

 110 Grant Apartments, Minneapolis, Minnesota
 Barbara Barker Center for Dance, University of Minnesota, Minneapolis, Minnesota
 Benedicta Arts Center (1964) and expansion (2006), College of Saint Benedict, Saint Joseph, Minnesota
 Bigelow Chapel, United Theological Seminary, New Brighton, Minnesota
 Capital One Hall, Tysons, Virginia
 Cedars-Sinai Medical Center, Los Angeles, California
 Chaffey College Center for the Arts, Rancho Cucamonga, California
 Colonial Church of Edina, Edina, Minnesota
 Columbus State University Performance and Visual Arts Campus, Columbus, Georgia
 General Mills Corporate Headquarters, Golden Valley, Minnesota
 Great Lakes Aquarium, Duluth, Minnesota
 Janet Wallace Fine Arts Center expansion and renovation, Macalester College, Saint Paul, Minnesota
 Lakewood Cemetery Garden Mausoleum, Minneapolis, Minnesota
 Lucile Packard Children's Hospital, Stanford University, Palo Alto, California
 Mayo Clinic College of Medicine Multidisciplinary Simulation Center, Rochester, Minnesota
 Medtronic World Headquarters, Fridley, Minnesota
 Minnesota History Center, Saint Paul, Minnesota
 Minnesota State Capitol restoration, Saint Paul, Minnesota
 Museum of the North, University of Alaska, Fairbanks, Alaska
 Napa Valley College Performing Arts Center, Napa, California
 Northeast Georgia Health Center, Braselton, Georgia
 Northrop Auditorium renovation, Minneapolis, Minnesota
 Orpheum Theatre (Minneapolis) restoration, Minneapolis, Minnesota
 Pantages Theater restoration, Minneapolis, Minnesota
 Plains Art Museum, Fargo, North Dakota
 Rochester Art Center, Rochester, Minnesota
 Southridge High School, Kennewick, Washington
 Surly Brewery, Minneapolis, Minnesota
 Target Field, Minneapolis, Minnesota
 Temple Israel addition, Minneapolis, Minnesota
 Texas A&M University–Commerce Music Building, Commerce, Texas
 UC Davis Medical Center, Sacramento, California
 Union Depot restoration, Saint Paul, Minnesota
 Valley Performing Arts Center, California State University, Northridge, Los Angeles, California
 Valparaiso University Center for the Arts, Valparaiso, Indiana
 Walker Art Center renovation (2017), Minneapolis, Minnesota

References

 Logan, Katharine (February 8, 2006) Of Glass and Warmth and Wood, ArchitectureWeek
 HGA Website 
 Emporis Website
 Hammel, Bette, (1989) From Bauhaus to Bow Ties: HGA Celebrates 35 Years

External links
HGA Website
Firm history at Great Buildings
ArchitectureWeek article

Architecture firms based in Minnesota
Companies based in Minneapolis